Zimbabwean coup d'état:
 2007 Zimbabwean alleged coup d'état attempt
 2017 Zimbabwean coup d'état